B44 may refer to:

 Bundesstraße 44, a federal highway in Germany
 B44 (New York City bus), a public transit line in Brooklyn, New York City, United States
 HLA-B44, a HLA-B serotype
 XB-44 Superfortress, an aircraft
 b4-4, a Canadian boy band
 BSA B44, a British motorcycle
 BSA B44 Shooting Star, a British motorcycle